Yaroslav Rostyslavovych Kinash (born 16 April 1988 in Lviv, Ukrainian SSR) is a professional Ukrainian football midfielder who plays for Nyva Ternopil.

Career
Kinash began his playing career in sportive school in native town Lviv. Than after short time in FC Halychyna in Amateur League he joined to FC Volyn Lutsk team. He made his first team debut entering against FC Obolon Kyiv on 20 March 2007.

References

External links 
 Profile at Official club site 
 
 

1988 births
Living people
Ukrainian footballers
Ukrainian expatriate footballers
Association football midfielders
FC Rukh Lviv players
FC Nyva Ternopil players
FC Volyn Lutsk players
FC Sambir players
Ukrainian Premier League players
Ukrainian expatriate sportspeople in Armenia
Expatriate footballers in Armenia
Sportspeople from Lviv